Military Police Corps may refer to:

Canadian Military Police Corps, which existed from 1917 to 1920
Military Police Corps (Indonesia)
Military Police Corps (Ireland)
Military Police Corps (Israel)
Military Police Corps (United States)

See also
Corps of Military Police (disambiguation)
Royal Military Police, a corps of the British Army 
Military police